The 1990–91 NBA season was the Hawks' 42nd season in the National Basketball Association, and 23rd season in Atlanta. During the off-season, the Hawks signed free agent All-Star guard Sidney Moncrief, who came out of his retirement. Under new head coach Bob Weiss, the Hawks won their first three games. However, after a 4–1 start, they lost nine consecutive games in November, but went on to win 20 of their next 25 games including a 7-game winning streak, and held a 26–21 record at the All-Star break. The Hawks finished fourth in the Central Division with a 43–39 record. 

Dominique Wilkins averaged 25.9 points, 9.0 rebounds and 1.5 steals per game, and was named to the All-NBA Second Team, and was selected for the 1991 NBA All-Star Game. In addition, Doc Rivers averaged 15.2 points and 1.9 steals per game, while Spud Webb provided the team with 13.4 points, 5.6 assists and 1.6 steals per game, and Kevin Willis provided with 13.1 points and 8.8 rebounds per game. Off the bench, Moses Malone played a sixth man role averaging 10.6 points and 8.1 rebounds per game, and John Battle contributed 13.6 points per game. Wilkins also finished in eighth place in Most Valuable Player voting.

In the Eastern Conference First Round of the playoffs, the Hawks faced the defending champion Detroit Pistons. The Hawks won Game 1 at The Palace of Auburn Hills, 103–98, but would lose the next two games. After winning Game 4 at The Omni, they lost the series in five games. Following the season, Rivers was traded to the Los Angeles Clippers, while Webb was dealt to the Sacramento Kings, Malone signed as a free agent with the Milwaukee Bucks, Battle signed with the Cleveland Cavaliers, and Moncrief retired.

Draft picks

Roster

Regular season

Season standings

y – clinched division title
x – clinched playoff spot

z – clinched division title
y – clinched division title
x – clinched playoff spot

Record vs. opponents

Game logs

Regular season

|- align="center" bgcolor="#ccffcc"
| 1
| November 2
| Orlando
| W 115-111
| D. Wilkins (32)
| K. Willis (11)
| D. Wilkins,R. Robinson (8)
| Omni Coliseum13,593
| 1–0
|- align="center" bgcolor="#ccffcc"
| 2
| November 3
| Indiana
| W 121-120
| D. Wilkins (30)
| M. Malone (14)
| R. Robinson (10)
| Omni Coliseum10,330
| 2–0
|- align="center" bgcolor="#ccffcc"
| 3
| November 6
| @ Sacramento
| W 102-85
| D. Wilkins (24)
| K. Willis (9)
| D. Wilkins (6)
| ARCO Arena17,014
| 3–0
|- align="center" bgcolor="#ffcccc"
| 4
| November 9
| @ Golden State
| L 128-143
| D. Wilkins (21)
| K. Willis (10)
| M. Malone (6)
| Oakland–Alameda County Coliseum Arena15,025
| 3–1
|- align="center" bgcolor="#ccffcc"
| 5
| November 10
| @ L.A. Clippers
| W 112-94
| G. Rivers (23)
| K. Willis (16)
| G. Rivers (9)
| Los Angeles Memorial Sports Arena13,228
| 4–1
|- align="center" bgcolor="#ffcccc"
| 6
| November 13
| Cleveland
| L 128-143
| D. Wilkins (27)
| K. Willis (13)
| M. Malone (6)
| Omni Coliseum15,025
| 4–2
|- align="center" bgcolor="#ffcccc"
| 7
| November 14
| @ Philadelphia
| L 104-112
| K. Willis (28)
| M. Malone (13)
| J. Battle (5)
| The Spectrum13,613
| 4–3
|- align="center" bgcolor="#ffcccc"
| 8
| November 16
| Charlotte
| L 109-119
| D. Wilkins (27)
| K. Willis (11)
| J. Battle (6)
| Omni Coliseum11,042
| 4–4
|- align="center" bgcolor="#ffcccc"
| 9
| November 17
| @ Detroit
| L 83-91
| J. Battle (16)
| K. Willis (10)
| A. Webb (5)
| The Palace of Auburn Hills21,454
| 4–5
|- align="center" bgcolor="#ffcccc"
| 10
| November 20
| @ Charlotte
| L 121-128
| D. Wilkins (29)
| D. Wilkins (10)
| D. Wilkins (7)
| Charlotte Coliseum23,901
| 4–6
|- align="center" bgcolor="#ffcccc"
| 11
| November 21
| @ Milwaukee
| L 93-105
| M. Malone (22)
| K. Willis (10)
| D. Wilkins (6)
| Bradley Center15,279
| 4–7
|- align="center" bgcolor="#ffcccc"
| 12
| November 24
| Philadelphia
| L 121-124
| D. Wilkins (39)
| M. Malone (11)
| A. Webb (14)
| Omni Coliseum15,594
| 4–8
|- align="center" bgcolor="#ffcccc"
| 13
| November 27
| Detroit
| L 97-120
| K. Willis,A. Webb (16)
| K. Willis (8)
| A. Webb (4)
| Omni Coliseum13,718
| 4–9
|- align="center" bgcolor="#ffcccc"
| 14
| November 30
| Cleveland
| L 93-101
| D. Wilkins (25)
| D. Wilkins (11)
| A. Webb (7)
| Omni Coliseum11,996
| 4–10

|- align="center" bgcolor="#ccffcc"
| 15
| December 4
| @ Houston
| W 113-110
| G. Rivers (26)
| D. Wilkins, M. Malone,  J. Koncak (7)
| A. Webb (8)
| The Summit13,578
| 5-10
|- align="center" bgcolor="#ccffcc"
| 16
| December 5
| @ San Antonio
| W 110-108
| G. Rivers (25)
| K. Willis (8)
| G. Rivers (7)
| HemisFair Arena15,908
| 6-10
|- align="center" bgcolor="#ffcccc"
| 17
| December 7
| Milwaukee
| L 103-104
| G. Rivers (24)
| T. McCormick (8)
| G. Rivers,  A. Webb (5)
| Omni Coliseum9,586
| 6–11
|- align="center" bgcolor="#ccffcc"
| 18
| December 8
| New York
| W 99-86
| D. Wilkins (26)
| G. Rivers,  J. Koncak (9)
| D. Wilkins (8)
| Omni Coliseum14,142
| 7–11
|- align="center" bgcolor="#ccffcc"
| 19
| December 12
| @ Miami
| W 118-93
| D. Wilkins (28)
| D. Wilkins (14)
| A. Webb (11)
| Miami Arena15,008
| 8–11
|- align="center" bgcolor="#ccffcc"
| 20
| December 13
| New Jersey
| W 106-97
| D. Wilkins (23)
| K. Willis,  M. Malone (10)
| J. Battle (7)
| Omni Coliseum9,107
| 9–11
|- align="center" bgcolor="#ccffcc"
| 21
| December 15
| Washington
| W 125-113
| J. Battle (28)
| K. Willis (8)
| G. Rivers (6)
| Omni Coliseum10,830
| 10–11
|- align="center" bgcolor="#ccffcc"
| 22
| December 17
| @ Cleveland
| W 109-98
| D. Wilkins (32)
| J. Koncak (13)
| G. Rivers (10)
| Coliseum at Richfield11,822
| 11–11
|- align="center" bgcolor="#ccffcc"
| 23
| December 20
| Utah
| W 105-87
| D. Wilkins (20)
| K. Willis (11)
| A. Webb (7)
| Omni Coliseum10,504
| 12–11
|- align="center" bgcolor="#ffcccc"
| 24
| December 21
| @ Detroit
| L 87-113
| J. Battle (22)
| D. Wilkins (7)
| T. Wilson,  R. Robinson (3)
| The Palace of Auburn Hills21,454
| 12–12
|- align="center" bgcolor="#ffcccc"
| 25
| December 23
| @ Boston
| L 104-132
| J. Battle (16)
| D. Ferrell (10)
| T. Wilson,  J. Koncak,  G. Rivers,  J. Battle (3)
| Boston Garden14,890
| 12–13
|- align="center" bgcolor="#ccffcc"
| 26
| December 26
| @ New Jersey
| W 113-111
| K. Willis (26)
| K. Willis (15)
| D. Wilkins,  J. Battle (4)
| Brendan Byrne Arena11,455
| 13–13
|- align="center" bgcolor="#ccffcc"
| 27
| December 28
| Boston
| W 131-114
| G. Rivers (36)
| M. Malone (9)
| A. Webb (8)
| Omni Coliseum16,390
| 14–13
|- align="center" bgcolor="#ccffcc"
| 28
| December 29
| Golden State
| W 134-130
| D. Wilkins (45)
| D. Wilkins (14)
| A. Webb (13)
| Omni Coliseum11,860
| 15–13

|- align="center" bgcolor="#ccffcc"
| 29
| January 2
| L.A. Clippers
| W 120-107
| D. Wilkins (35)
| D. Wilkins (16)
| G. Rivers (11)
| Omni Coliseum8,733
| 16–13
|- align="center" bgcolor="#ccffcc"
| 30
| January 4
| Indiana
| W 111-96
| D. Wilkins (36)
| M. Malone (11)
| G. Rivers,  R. Robinson (5)
| Omni Coliseum10,124
| 17–13
|- align="center" bgcolor="#ccffcc"
| 31
| January 5
| Minnesota
| W 117-112 (OT)
| J. Battle (27)
| K. Willis (19)
| J. Koncak (7)
| Omni Coliseum10,988
| 18–13
|- align="center" bgcolor="#ccffcc"
| 32
| January 8
| San Antonio
| W 109-98
| D. Wilkins (40)
| K. Willis (9)
| G. Rivers (10)
| Omni Coliseum12,608
| 19–13
|- align="center" bgcolor="#ffcccc"
| 33
| January 11
| @ Chicago
| L 96-99
| D. Wilkins (23)
| D. Wilkins (12)
| J. Battle (7)
| Chicago Stadium18,676
| 19-14
|- align="center" bgcolor="#ffcccc"
| 34
| January 12
| @ New York
| L 92-99
| D. Wilkins (22)
| G. Rivers (8)
| G. Rivers,  R. Robinson (6)
| Madison Square Garden17,457
| 19-15
|- align="center" bgcolor="#ccffcc"
| 35
| January 14
| New York
| W 96-82
| D. Wilkins (26)
| D. Wilkins (16)
| J. Battle,  S. Moncrief (4)
| Omni Coliseum12,612
| 20-15
|- align="center" bgcolor="#ccffcc"
| 36
| January 15
| @ Indiana
| W 117-106
| D. Wilkins (28)
| D. Wilkins (12)
| J. Battle (8)
| Market Square Arena9,531
| 21-15
|- align="center" bgcolor="#ccffcc"
| 37
| January 18
| Chicago
| W 114-105
| D. Wilkins (34)
| M. Malone (12)
| G. Rivers (5)
| Omni Coliseum16,390
| 22-15
|- align="center" bgcolor="#ccffcc"
| 38
| January 19
| New Jersey
| W 114-84
| K. Willis (24)
| K. Willis (17)
| A. Webb (6)
| Omni Coliseum15,758
| 23-15
|- align="center" bgcolor="#ccffcc"
| 39
| January 22
| Miami
| W 118-107
| K. Willis (29)
| K. Willis (10)
| G. Rivers,A. Webb,D. Wilkins (7)
| Omni Coliseum10,440
| 24-15
|- align="center" bgcolor="#ffcccc"
| 40
| January 23
| @ Washington
| L 99-104
| D. Wilkins (27)
| D. Wilkins (13)
| G. Rivers (7)
| Capital Centre9,830
| 24-16
|- align="center" bgcolor="#ffcccc"
| 41
| January 26
| @ Seattle
| L 102-103
| D. Wilkins (43)
| D. Wilkins (10)
| A. Webb (9)
| Seattle Center Coliseum12,792
| 24-17
|- align="center" bgcolor="#ffcccc"
| 42
| January 28
| @ Portland
| L 111-116
| D. Wilkins (34)
| K. Willis (10)
| A. Webb (11)
| Memorial Coliseum12,884
| 24-18
|- align="center" bgcolor="#ffcccc"
| 43
| January 29
| @ Utah
| L 105-116
| D. Wilkins (24)
| D. Wilkins (14)
| A. Webb (4)
| Salt Palace12,616
| 24-19
|- align="center" bgcolor="#ffcccc"
| 44
| January 31
| @ L.A. Lakers
| L 103-116
| D. Wilkins (19)
| M. Malone (9)
| G. Rivers (4)
| Great Western Forum17,505
| 24-20

|- align="center" bgcolor="#ffcccc"
| 45
| February 2
| @ Denver
| L 125-126
| D. Wilkins (34)
| D. Wilkins (12)
| D. Wilkins (7)
| McNichols Sports Arena14,683
| 24-21
|- align="center" bgcolor="#ccffcc"
| 46
| February 5
| Cleveland
| W 118-114
| D. Wilkins (40)
| D. Wilkins (13)
| G. Rivers (12)
| Omni Coliseum11,354
| 25-21
|- align="center" bgcolor="#ccffcc"
| 47
| February 7
| Charlotte
| W 127-114
| M. Malone (25)
| J. Koncak (11)
| A. Webb (6)
| Omni Coliseum10,671
| 26-21
|- align="center" bgcolor="#ffcccc"
| 48
| February 12
| @ Chicago
| L 113-122
| D. Wilkins (37)
| D. Wilkins,M.Malone (11)
| A. Webb (9)
| Chicago Stadium18,595
| 26-22
|- align="center" bgcolor="#ffcccc"
| 49
| February 13
| @ New Jersey
| L 106-140
| D. Wilkins (24)
| K. Willis (8)
| A. Webb (3)
| Brendan Byrne Arena10,583
| 26-23
|- align="center" bgcolor="#ccffcc"
| 50
| February 16
| Seattle
| W 122-113
| D. Wilkins (36)
| D. Wilkins (10)
| A. Webb (14)
| Omni Coliseum15,924
| 27-23
|- align="center" bgcolor="#ccffcc"
| 51
| February 19
| @ New York
| W 110-102
| D. Wilkins (32)
| M. Malone (13)
| G. Rivers (9)
| Madison Square Garden13,791
| 28-23
|- style="background-color:#ffcccc;"
| 52
| February 20
| @ New York
| L 89-97
| D. Wilkins (19)
| M. Malone (10)
| A. Webb (6)
| The Palace of Auburn Hills21,454
| 28-24
|- align="center" bgcolor="#ccffcc"
| 53
| February 22
| L.A. Lakers
| W 111-102
| D. Wilkins (34)
| M. Malone (13)
| A. Webb (6)
| Omni Coliseum16,371
| 29-24
|- align="center" bgcolor="#ccffcc"
| 54
| February 23
| Dallas
| W 122-107
| D. Wilkins (31)
| D. Wilkins (14)
| A. Webb (7)
| Omni Coliseum12,376
| 30-24
|- align="center" bgcolor="#ccffcc"
| 55
| February 23
| Sacramento
| W 96-88
| D. Wilkins (31)
| D. Wilkins (19)
| J. Battle (4)
| Omni Coliseum10,461
| 31-24
|- style="background-color:#ffcccc;"
| 56
| February 27
| @ Philadelphia
| L 103-107
| D. Wilkins (26)
| M. Malone (17)
| A. Webb (10)
| The Spectrum16,121
| 31-25
|- align="center" bgcolor="#ccffcc"
| 57
| February 28
| Portland
| W 117-109
| J. Battle (26)
| D. Wilkins (14)
| G. Rivers (8)
| Omni Coliseum14,297
| 32-25

|- align="center" bgcolor="#ccffcc"
| 58
| March 3
| @ Milwaukee
| W 115-106
| D. Wilkins (25)
| D. Wilkins,M. Malone (11)
| A. Webb (5)
| Bradley Center16,341
| 33-25
|- align="center" bgcolor="#ccffcc"
| 59
| March 5
| Denver
| W 139-127
| A. Webb (32)
| D. Wilkins (18)
| J. Battle (5)
| Omni Coliseum13,500
| 34-25
|- style="background-color:#ffcccc;"
| 60
| March 7
| Phoenix
| L 104-106
| D. Wilkins (27)
| M. Malone (19)
| G. Rivers,A. Webb,D. Wilkins(4)
| Omni Coliseum12,184
| 34-26
|- align="center" bgcolor="#ccffcc"
| 61
| March 8
| @ Miami
| W 102-96
| G. Rivers (19)
| Kevin Willis (12)
| D. Wilkins (6)
| Miami Arena15,008
| 35-26
|- style="background-color:#ffcccc;"
| 62
| March 10
| Chicago
| L 87-122
| A. Webb (18)
| D. Wilkins (8)
| A. Webb (8)
| Omni Coliseum16,371
| 35-27
|- style="background-color:#ffcccc;"
| 63
| March 12
| Philadelphia
| L 129-133(2 OT)
| D. Wilkins (29)
| K. Willis (14)
| G. Rivers (9)
| Omni Coliseum13,372
| 35-28
|- align="center" bgcolor="#ccffcc"
| 64
| March 15
| @ Dallas
| W 127-117
| J. Battle (28)
| M. Malone (14)
| A. Webb (6)
| Reunion Arena17,007
| 36-28
|- style="background-color:#ffcccc;"
| 65
| March 16
| @ Phoenix
| L 116-128
| D. Wilkins (29)
| D. Wilkins (10)
| G. Rivers,A. Webb,D. Wilkins (5)
| Arizona Veterans Memorial Coliseum14,487
| 36-29
|- align="center" bgcolor="#ccffcc"
| 66
| March 19
| Boston
| W 104-92
| A. Webb (26)
| M. Malone (11)
| A. Webb (5)
| Omni Coliseum15,793
| 37-29
|- style="background-color:#ffcccc;"
| 67
| March 20
| @ Chicago
| L 107-129
| D. Wilkins (28)
| M. Malone (10)
| G. Rivers (7)
| Chicago Stadium18,439
| 37-30
|- style="background-color:#ffcccc;"
| 68
| March 22
| @ Washington
| L 116-121
| D. Wilkins (26)
| K. Willis (10)
| A. Webb (4)
| Capital Centre10,409
| 37-31
|- align="center" bgcolor="#ccffcc"
| 69
| March 23
| Miami
| W 108-93
| D. Wilkins (26)
| J. Koncak,M. Malone,D. Wilkins (9)
| G. Rivers,D. Wilkins (4)
| Omni Coliseum14,159
| 38-31
|- style="background-color:#ffcccc;"
| 70
| March 26
| @ Indiana
| L 113-123
| D. Wilkins (34)
| J. Koncak (10)
| A. Webb (7)
| Market Square Arena10,178
| 38-32
|- style="background-color:#ffcccc;"
| 71
| March 28
| Houston
| L 111-112
| D. Wilkins (28)
| K. Willis (17)
| A. Webb (7)
| Omni Coliseum13,208
| 38-33
|- style="background-color:#ffcccc;"
| 72
| March 30
| @ Milwaukee
| L 96-104
| D. Wilkins (27)
| J. Koncak,D. Wilkins (13)
| D. Wilkins (5)
| Bradley Center17,683
| 38-34

|- style="background-color:#ffcccc;"
| 73
| April 4
| @ Charlotte
| L 91-98
| D. Wilkins (26)
| J. Koncak (12)
| A. Webb (6)
| Charlotte Coliseum23,901
| 38-35
|- align="center" bgcolor="#ccffcc"
| 74
| April 6
| Indiana
| W 137-110
| D. Wilkins (30)
| K. Willis (13)
| A. Webb (9)
| Omni Coliseum14,931
| 39-35
|- align="center" bgcolor="#ccffcc"
| 75
| April 8
| Washington
| W 105-94
| D. Wilkins (29)
| M. Malone (9)
| A. Webb (7)
| Omni Coliseum13,339
| 40-35
|- align="center" bgcolor="#ccffcc"
| 76
| April 9
| @ Cleveland
| W 104-98
| D. Wilkins (25)
| K. Willis (14)
| A. Webb (9)
| Coliseum at Richfield15,235
| 41-35
|- style="background-color:#ffcccc;"
| 77
| April 11
| @ Minnesota
| W 98-112
| A. Webb (23)
| K. Willis (8)
| G. Rivers (5)
| Target Center19,006
| 41-36
|- align="center" bgcolor="#ccffcc"
| 78
| April 13
| Milwaukee
| W 97-91
| A. Webb (23)
| M. Malone (11)
| A. Webb (6)
| Omni Coliseum14,687
| 42-36
|- style="background-color:#ffcccc;"
| 79
| April 16
| @ Orlando
| L 106-113
| D. Wilkins (19)
| D. Wilkins (8)
| R. Robinson (6)
| Orlando Arena15,077
| 42-37
|- style="background-color:#ffcccc;"
| 80
| April 17
| Charlotte
| L 111-123
| D. Wilkins (20)
| K. Willis (16)
| A. Webb (5)
| Omni Coliseum12,783
| 42-38
|- style="background-color:#ffcccc;"
| 81
| April 19
| Detroit
| L 120-126
| D. Wilkins (38)
| M. Malone (12)
| A. Webb (5)
| Omni Coliseum16,390
| 42-39
|- align="center" bgcolor="#ccffcc"
| 82
| April 21
| @ Boston
| W 117-105
| D. Wilkins (24)
| D. Wilkins (9)
| G. Rivers,A. Webb (5)
| Boston Garden14,890
| 43-39

Playoffs

|- align="center" bgcolor="#ccffcc"
| 1
| April 26
| @ Detroit
| W 103–98
| Dominique Wilkins (32)
| Kevin Willis (8)
| Battle, Webb (3)
| The Palace of Auburn Hills21,454
| 1–0
|- align="center" bgcolor="#ffcccc"
| 2
| April 28
| @ Detroit
| L 88–101
| Dominique Wilkins (20)
| Kevin Willis (9)
| Dominique Wilkins (5)
| The Palace of Auburn Hills21,454
| 1–1
|- align="center" bgcolor="#ffcccc"
| 3
| April 30
| Detroit
| L 91–103
| Kevin Willis (24)
| Kevin Willis (10)
| Spud Webb (9)
| Omni Coliseum13,571
| 1–2
|- align="center" bgcolor="#ccffcc"
| 4
| May 2
| Detroit
| W 123–111
| Doc Rivers (34)
| Wilkins, Malone (11)
| Spud Webb (7)
| Omni Coliseum9,854
| 2–2
|- align="center" bgcolor="#ffcccc"
| 5
| May 5
| @ Detroit
| L 81–113
| Kevin Willis (13)
| Kevin Willis (13)
| Jon Koncak (4)
| The Palace of Auburn Hills21,454
| 2–3

Player statistics

Season

*Statistics with the Atlanta Hawks

Playoffs

Awards

Season
 Dominique Wilkins was named to the All-NBA Second Team

All-Star
 Dominique Wilkins was selected to his 6th All-Star Game.

Transactions

Trades

Free agents

Additions

Subtractions

Waivings

Player Transactions Citation:

References

External links
 1990–91 Atlanta Hawks season at Basketball Reference

See also
 1990–91 NBA season

Atlanta Hawks seasons
Atlanta Haw
Atlanta Haw
Atlanta Hawks